The 2006 NHL Entry Draft was the 44th NHL Entry Draft. It was held at General Motors Place in Vancouver, British Columbia, on June 24, 2006.

The draft order for the first 14 picks was decided during a lottery held on April 20, 2006. The draft was televised in Canada on TSN and RDS, with the first three hours simulcasted in the United States on OLN.

As of 2019, eleven players from the 2006 draft have been named NHL All-Stars, or to the All-Star team. Players named range from the 1st overall pick of Erik Johnson to the 180th selection, Leo Komarov.

Draft day trades 

 The Florida Panthers traded Roberto Luongo, Lukas Krajicek and the 163rd pick (Sergei Shirokov) to the Vancouver Canucks for Todd Bertuzzi, Alex Auld and Bryan Allen. (This trade was completed two days prior to the draft, and officially announced the day before it.)
 The Atlanta Thrashers traded Patrik Stefan and Jaroslav Modry to the Dallas Stars for Niko Kapanen and the 210th pick (Will O'Neill).
 The Colorado Avalanche traded Alex Tanguay to the Calgary Flames for Jordan Leopold, the 59th pick (Codey Burki) and a conditional draft pick in 2007 or 2008.
 The Montreal Canadiens traded the 16th pick (Ty Wishart) to the San Jose Sharks for the 20th pick (David Fischer) and the 53rd pick (Mathieu Carle).
 The Los Angeles Kings traded Pavol Demitra to the Minnesota Wild for Patrick O'Sullivan and the 17th pick (Trevor Lewis).
 The Boston Bruins traded Andrew Raycroft to the Toronto Maple Leafs for Tuukka Rask.

Final central scouting rankings

Skaters

Goaltenders

Selections by round

Round one

Round two

Round three

Round four

Round five

Round six

Round seven

Draftees based on nationality

North American draftees by province/state

See also 
2006–07 NHL season
List of NHL first overall draft choices
List of NHL players

References

External links 
 2006 NHL Entry Draft player stats at The Internet Hockey Database

National Hockey League Entry Draft
Draft